Anant Gudhe (born 16 March 1956) is a member of the 14th Lok Sabha of India. He represents the Amravati constituency of Maharashtra and is a member of the Shiv Sena (SS) political party. He was also member of 11th and 13th Lok Sabha from Amravati.

External links
 [ Official biographical sketch in Parliament of India website]

|-

Living people
1956 births
People from Maharashtra
India MPs 1996–1997
India MPs 1999–2004
India MPs 2004–2009
Marathi politicians
People from Amravati
People from Amravati district
Lok Sabha members from Maharashtra
Shiv Sena politicians